The All for Australia League (AFAL) was an Australian political movement during the Great Depression. It was founded in early 1931 and claimed to have amassed 130,000 members by June 1931.  Right-wing and anti-establishment in nature, the league had the backing of a number of prominent businessmen and industrialists. It was critical both of the Labor Party and the right-wing Nationalist Party. It primarily operated in Sydney, but also had branches in country New South Wales and absorbed a similar organisation in Victoria. The league eventually chose to co-operate with the existing Nationalist organisation at the 1931 federal election, helping preselect candidates for the new United Australia Party (UAP). After the election victory the league was absorbed by the UAP's state organisation.

Objectives
Five objectives were announced at the official launch of the league, held at Killara on 12 February 1931:
 To create a unity of purpose amongst citizens and organisations to meet the economic and social crises.
 To exert constitutional pressure on Governments in support of the following or other necessary measures: (a) Restoration of National Credit, (b) Economy of Governmental administration and expenditure, (c) Balancing of Federal and State budgets.
 To set aside conflicting sectional interests for the sake of unity of purpose.
 To conjoin the interests of Country and City, that is, all producing and consuming interests.
 To bring about the whole hearted cooperation of employer and employee.

According to labour historian Geoffrey Robinson, the league "posed a major challenge to the established conservative parties", but ultimately "failed because Australian conservatives regrouped and moved back towards the centre".

Membership
The league undertook an extensive recruiting campaign, mostly in Sydney but also in some country areas. It claimed to have gained 30,000 members within three weeks after its launch, rising to 40,000 a week later. Up to 3,500 badges were being issued each day, bearing the distinctive emblem of a six-pointed star. By the end of March 1931, the league claimed 99 branches, including fifteen outside Sydney. The membership stood at 116,000 on 14 April and 130,000 by the end of June.

Most of the league's leadership had not previously been involved in politics. The executive was "strongly representative of managerial and professional men". Former engineering professor Alexander James Gibson was elected president of the league. Other members of the league's provisional executive included:
Major-General Gordon Bennett, brother of Alfred Bennett
Andrew Craig, treasurer of the Sydney Chamber of Commerce
Albert Heath, president of the Sydney and Suburban Timber Merchants' Association
Cecil Hoskins, chairman and managing director of Australian Iron and Steel
Norman Keyser, managing director of General Industries
Robert A. Malloch, managing director of Dangar, Gedye & Malloch, meat preservers
Sydney Snow, vice-president of the Retail Traders' Association
Frederick Walker, managing director of F. J. Walker, meat exporters
Later members of the executive included:
Alfred Bennett, manager of radio station 2GB, founder of the Who's for Australia? League, brother of Gordon Bennett
Sir Henry Braddon, member of the New South Wales Legislative Council
Charles M. McDonald, president of the New South Wales Employers' Federation
Mildred Muscio, feminist, representative of the women's committee
Olof Oberg, timber merchant and president of the anti-communist Sane Democracy League

Braddon, Craig, Heath, and Oberg resigned from the executive over the league's attacks on the state Nationalist Party.

References

Further reading

1931 establishments in Australia
Defunct political parties in New South Wales
Political parties established in 1931
Political parties disestablished in 1932
1932 disestablishments in Australia